In quality management system, a quality policy is a document developed by management to express the directive of the top management with respect to quality.  Quality policy management is a strategic item.

Section 5.2 of the ISO 9001:2015 standard requires a written, well-defined quality policy that is communicated and understood within an organization. Section 5.2 also sets out some of the requirements for quality policies.

See also
 ISO 9000
 Quality circle
 Total quality management

References

Quality management